Jamie Oliver Grove (born 3 July 1979) is an English former first-class cricketer who played for Essex, Somerset and Leicestershire during his career which spanned from 1998 to 2003.

Career
Early in his career, Grove appeared for the England Under-19 cricket team, playing Youth Test matches against South Africa and Pakistan, and participating in the 1998 ICC Under-19 Cricket World Cup. He made his first-class debut in 1998, appearing for Essex against Surrey. During the match he claimed three wickets, all in the first innings. He played seven more times for Essex over that season and the next, before moving to Somerset for the 2000 season. He appeared regularly for the team throughout 2000, but only made four first-class appearances in 2001, and at the end of the season, moved to Leicestershire. He played just three first-class matches for Leicestershire in his two years at the club. He played a lot more regularly for Leicestershire in one-day competitions.

References

1979 births
English cricketers
Essex cricketers
Leicestershire cricketers
Somerset cricketers
Sportspeople from Bury St Edmunds
Living people